There are many statues installed along Paseo de la Reforma, in Mexico City, Mexico. Major monuments include the Angel of Independence, the Diana the Huntress Fountain, the Monument to Christopher Columbus, and the Monument to Cuauhtémoc. Other sculptures include El Ángel de la Seguridad Social, El Caballito, How Doth the Little Crocodile, and Puerta 1808, and formerly the statue of Heydar Aliyev.

List of statues

Statues from Puerta de los Leones, Chapultepec to the Angel of Independence

In late 2021, 14 statues of women were installed in a section named Paseo de las Heroínas (Heroines Boulevard). The subjects are:

Josefa Ortiz de Domínguez
Leona Vicario
Gertrudis Bocanegra
Forjadoras Anónimas de la Nación (anonymous female shapers of the nation)
Juana Inés de la Cruz
Margarita Maza
Dolores Jiménez y Muro
Matilde Montoya
Carmen Serdán
Juana Belén Gutiérrez
Agustina Ramírez
Elvia Carrillo Puerto
Hermila Galindo
Sara Pérez Romero

Statues from the Angel of Independence to El Caballito

38 statues have been installed between the Angel of Independence and El Caballito, depicting the following individuals:

 Ignacio Ramírez
 
 Rafael Lucio Nájera
 Miguel Lerdo de Tejada
 
 Andrés Quintana Roo
 Nicolás García de San Vicente
 
 Ignacio Pesqueira
 Jesús García Morales
 
 Servando Teresa de Mier
 Carlos María de Bustamante
 Antonio León
 José Mariano Jiménez
 Ponciano Arriaga
 Donato Guerra
 
 Guadalupe Victoria
 
 Plutarco González, installed in 2006?
 , installed in 2006?
 
 
 José Eduardo de Cárdenas
 
 Francisco Primo de Verdad y Ramos
 José María Chávez Alonso
 Hermenegildo Galeana
 Leonardo Bravo
 Ramón Corona
 Antonio Rosales
 Ignacio López Rayón
 Francisco Manuel Sánchez de Tagle
 Pedro José Méndez
 
 , removed/relocated?
 Miguel Ramos Arizpe, removed/relocated?

Statues from El Caballito to Peravillo
There are 39 additional statues installed between El Caballito and Peravillo:

 José María Luis Mora
 
 Juan Álvarez
 
 Guillermo Prieto
 Gabino Barreda
 Mariano Escobedo
 Eustaquio Buelna Pérez
 
 
 
 José María Lafragua
 Manuel Doblado
 
 
 
 Bibiano Dávalos López
 Clodomiro Cota Márquez
 
 
 
 José María Arteaga
 
 
 
 
 
 Jesús González Ortega
 Francisco García Salinas
 Vicente Riva Palacio
 Manuel Payno
 José María Iglesias
 
 Francisco Leyva Arciniega
 José Diego Fernández Torres
 Santos Degollado
 Melchor Ocampo
 Ignacio Manuel Altamirano

References

External links

 

Statues on Paseo de la Reforma
Paseo de la Reforma
Outdoor sculptures in Mexico City
Paseo de la Reforma
statues on Paseo de la Reforma

es:Monumentos de Paseo de la Reforma